Leonora is a feminine given name which is a variation of Eleanor. It was relatively common in the 19th century in Western countries, ranking as the 314th most popular female given name in the United States in 1880.  The name has declined in popularity but remains in use. Sixty-four newborn American girls were given the name in 2020.

People
Leonara Elizabeth Grant (1931–2016),  New Zealand actress, known as Lee Grant
Leonora Baroni, seventeenth century musician and composer
Leonora Braham, English opera singer and actress
Leonora Carrington, Mexican surrealist painter
Leonora Christina (disambiguation), Danish princess
Leonora Duarte, Flemish musician and composer
Leonora Beck Ellis (1862-1951), American educator, author, poet, social reformer
Leonora Hornblow (1920–2005), American novelist, children's writer and socialite 
Leonora Jakupi, singer from Kosovo
Leonora Jiménez, former Miss Asia Pacific International
Leonora King, Canadian physician
Leonora Jessie Little (1865–1945), Australian zoologist and philanthropist
Leonora O'Reilly, American feminist, suffragist, and trade union organizer
Leonora Sanvitale
Leonora (singer) Danish singer, representing Denmark at the Eurovision Song Contest 2019

Fictional characters
Leonora Orantes, in the 2011 film Contagion, played by Marion Cotillard
"Leonora" is used for Eleonora di Guienna, a main character in Donizetti's opera Rosmonda d'Inghilterra
Leonora, the heroine of Verdi's operas La forza del destino and Il trovatore
Leonora Ashburnham, in the Ford Madox Ford novel The Good Soldier
Leonora, in the film Topsy-Turvy
Leonora, the villain of the Mexican TV series Miss XV
Leonora, in the video game Final Fantasy IV: The After Years
Leonora, in the novel In a dark, dark wood by Ruth Ware

References

See also
Leonore (given name)
Leonor, Princess of Asturias, Spanish princess

English feminine given names